Sekolah Dian Harapan is a national plus school in Lippo Karawaci, Banten, Jakarta, Daan Mogot, Manado, and Makassar.

Sekolah Dian Harapan was established on 1995.

Sekolah Dian Harapan was under Yayasan Pendidikan Pelita Harapan. 

Schools in Indonesia
National Plus schools
Educational institutions established in 1995
1995 establishments in Indonesia